Simon Wulfse (born January 12, 1952 in Dordrecht) is a strongman from the Netherlands. He finished third at the World's Strongest Man games in 1983. Wulfse won the Europe's Strongest Man title in 1983, his career best finish. He finished first in Strongest man of the Netherlands in 1982, and third in 1984. Wulfse also finished 3rd at the 1986 and 1987 World Muscle Power Championships.

He was arrested in 1989 and convicted of drug smuggling.

Honours
 1st place Strongest man of the Netherlands (1982)
 1st place Europe's Strongest Man (1983)
 3rd place World's Strongest Man  (1983)

References 

1952 births
Living people
Dutch strength athletes
Sportspeople from Dordrecht